Manuel Gutiérrez Hernández (born 8 April 1920, date of death unknown) was a Mexican football league defender.

Career
Gutiérrez played for Mexico in the 1950 FIFA World Cup. He also played for Club América.

Gutiérrez is deceased.

References

External links
FIFA profile

1920 births
Year of death missing
Mexican footballers
Mexico international footballers
Association football defenders
Club América footballers
1950 FIFA World Cup players